Richard Irvine Manning III (August 15, 1859 – September 11, 1931) was an American politician from the U.S. state of South Carolina. He served as a state legislator and as the 92nd governor of South Carolina.

Biography
Richard Irvine Manning III was born in Sumter County, South Carolina on August 15, 1859 to Richard Irvine Manning II.  His grandfather, Richard Irvine Manning I, had served as governor of the state from 1824 to 1826.

He attended the University of Virginia from 1877 to 1879.

Manning's political career started during the era of Ben Tillman, and Manning served in the South Carolina House of Representatives from 1892 to 1896 before moving up to the South Carolina Senate from 1898 to 1906.  When he was elected to the governorship in 1914, Manning brought many Progressive Era reforms to a state that had spent four years under the demagogic leadership of Coleman Livingston Blease.  During his first term in office, South Carolina prohibited alcohol, established the state's first compulsory education law, and raised the minimum age for employment to 14.  South Carolinians expressed their approval of these measures by re-electing Manning to a second term in 1916.

He died on September 11, 1931 at his home in Columbia, South Carolina. He had been ill for three months.

He is interred in the churchyard at Trinity Episcopal Church in Columbia, South Carolina.

Family

On February 10, 1881, at Richmond, Virginia, Manning married Lelia Bernard Meredith, the daughter of a judge. Six of their sons served in the First World War, with one of them, Major William Sinkler Manning (January 28, 1886 – November 5, 1918) dying in action.

External links

Further reading
Robert Milton Burts (1974). Richard Irvine Manning and the Progressive Movement in South Carolina. University of South Carolina Press.

References

1859 births
1931 deaths
University of Virginia alumni
Democratic Party governors of South Carolina
University of South Carolina trustees
Clemson University trustees
People from Sumter County, South Carolina